Chipping Norton railway station served the town of Chipping Norton, Oxfordshire, England. The station had two platforms and a signal box.

History
The line was promoted by William Bliss and its traffic included freight to and from his tweed mill at Chipping Norton.

Goods trains started running to the station in June 1855 and the official opening to passengers took place on 10 August 1855.

The station comprised a single platform and two-storey building. No photographs exist, but Bliss Tweed publicity material includes drawings of the station. A single-road engine shed, water tank and goods shed were also provided. Following complaints by passengers of the exposed state of the station a wooden overall roof was added. In 1872 a siding was added to serve the gasworks adjacent to the tweed mill.

In 1860 the OW&WR amalgamated with two other railway companies to form the West Midland Railway. In 1863 the WMR amalgamated with the GWR and Chipping Norton became part of the Great Western system.

A bridge was built to take the new line under the Worcester Road, although it would be twelve years before the first train passed under it. Work also started on the Chipping Norton Tunnel. However, the B&CDR experienced financial difficulties and the building work ceased in 1877 with the tunnel uncompleted. Construction resumed six years later in 1883 with the line to  finally opening on 6 April 1887. The GWR operated the services over the new line. In 1897 the B&CDR was purchased by the GWR.

The old station was no longer required and was demolished, the area it had occupied becoming the new goods yard. The engine shed remained for many years; it was closed in 1922 and was demolished by 1947. The small weighbridge building survived until the closure of the line, the only original building to do so.

The new station was sited on a curve. The main station building was on the down side with a small shelter on the up side. A lattice girder footbridge linked the two platforms. There were two signal boxes: Chipping Norton East on the station platform and Chipping Norton West near to the Bliss Tweed Mill. The West box was abolished in August 1929 and the East Box was renamed Chipping Norton Signal Box.

In 1904 a 6-stall stable was built for the railway's horses. It was no longer required for this purpose after 1921 as delivery work had been contracted out. In 1929 a large door was added in the end wall and the building was used to house GWR motor buses. In 1948 it continued in use as a garage but for the Zonal Delivery Scheme lorries. The stable is the only railway building at Chipping Norton to survive to the present day.

There was a dramatic fall in passenger traffic during the 1920s. 30,455 tickets were sold in 1923 but by 1929 this had fallen to 9,951. Parcels and goods traffic increased slightly over the same period. Jenkins, Brown and Parkhouse attribute the fall in passenger traffic to the transfer of railway road transport services to the local bus company.

In 1948 Chipping Norton became a railhead for the Zonal Delivery Scheme. The goods shed was modified with a series of loading bays constructed enabling goods to be unloaded from wagons straight into lorries for local delivery.

When Britain's railways were nationalised in 1948 the Banbury and Cheltenham line became part of the Western Region of British Railways. British Railways withdrew passenger services from the Chipping Norton - Kings Sutton section in 1951. The landslide was never cleared and after this time the only trains running north from Chipping Norton were occasional goods services to Rollright Siding. The Kingham to Chipping Norton line was listed in The Reshaping of British Railways report, although with an asterisk to indicate that closure had already been decided before compilation of the report. The final passenger train ran on 1 December 1962. BR withdrew freight traffic from the line in 1964 and it was dismantled in 1965.

Accidents 
In 1907, a small tank engine (no. 546) and a Toad Brake Van crashed into the West Signal Box. The Brake Van was severely damaged, and the engine became derailed. The rails were taken up by the force of the locomotive.

World War Two 
World War Two saw many children from London being evacuated to small towns and villages in the countryside. Chipping Norton was one such place, and trains brought children from Acton and Ealing Broadway to places such as Oxford and Chipping Norton. These trains were some of the longest to have ever used the platforms at the station.

Modern day 

The site that was once occupied by the station and goods yard is now part of an industrial estate, and only the stable remains. The tunnel through the hill and bridge for the road still exist, but the tunnel has been closed and has become flooded due to the filling-in of the bridge.

Route

References

Sources

Disused railway stations in Oxfordshire
Former Great Western Railway stations
Railway stations in Great Britain opened in 1855
Railway stations in Great Britain closed in 1962
Chipping Norton